The 1991 Holy Cross Crusaders football team was an American football team that represented the College of the Holy Cross as a member of the Patriot League during the 1991 NCAA Division I-AA football season.  In its sixth year under head coach Mark Duffner, the team compiled an 11–0 record (5–0 against conference opponents), won the Patriot League championship, and was ranked No. 3 in the NCAA Division I-AA Football Committee poll. The team played its home games at Fitton Field in Worcester, Massachusetts.

Schedule

References

Holy Cross
Holy Cross Crusaders football seasons
Patriot League football champion seasons
College football undefeated seasons
Holy Cross Crusaders football